53rd Battalion may refer to:

 53rd Battalion (Australia)
 53rd Battalion (Northern Saskatchewan), CEF
 53rd Transportation Battalion, a transportation battalion of the United States Army